Geonkhali is a village and scenic tourist spot in the Mahishadal Block of East Midnapore district of West Bengal.

Geography

Location
It is located 130 km to the south of Kolkata at the confluence of the rivers Hooghly, Rupnarayan and Damodar. At the confluence, the river is so wide as to resemble the sea, making for a spectacular sight. Geonkhali is connected to Gadiara and Nurpur by regular launch services.

National Waterway
Geonkhali lies at the head of the 623-km long National Waterway 5 that includes the Hijli Tidal Canal and the East Coast Canal linking it to Orissa's Paradip and Dhamra ports and the Matai, Brahmani and Mahanadi rivers.

Urbanisation
79.19% of the population of Haldia subdivision live in the rural areas. Only 20.81% of the population live in the urban areas, and that is the highest proportion of urban population amongst the four subdivisions in Purba Medinipur district.

Note: The map alongside presents some of the notable locations in the subdivision. All places marked in the map are linked in the larger full screen map.

Economy

Water Treament Plants
Geonkhali houses several water treatment plants that supply fresh water to Haldia where the water is saline.

Abandoned proposal of a ship yard project
A proposed 2,200-crore shipyard project by the Apeejay and Bharti groups at Geonkhali was abandoned in the aftermath of the Singur and Nandigram incidents following opposition by local residents to acquisition of their fertile agricultural lands. The village affected were: Bhangagora, Deulpota, Badur, Babupur and Hariballavpur.

External links

References 

Villages in Purba Medinipur district